Third Party Internet Access (TPIA) refers to a Canadian Radio-television and Telecommunications Commission (CRTC)  ruling forcing Cable operators (MSO) to offer Internet access to third party resellers.

External links
Report On Third Party ISP Access To Major Canadian Cable Systems For the CRTC
CRTC home

Mass media regulation in Canada